Frisco is an unincorporated community located in Pointe Coupee Parish, Louisiana, United States.

History
The area was once known as Friscoville.  The town received its name from the Frisco Gulf Coast Lines' New Orleans-Houston rail line that was built nearby in 1904.  In 1912, a post office was built in the community, but it was closed in 1916 and moved to Livonia.

Geography
Frisco is situated north of Livonia, in the area of the intersection between Louisiana Highway 78 and Louisiana Highway 979. A body of water known as Bayou George flows through the area.

References

Unincorporated communities in Pointe Coupee Parish, Louisiana
Baton Rouge metropolitan area
Unincorporated communities in Louisiana